A component in the Unified Modeling Language represents a modular part of a system that encapsulates the state and behavior of a number of classifiers. Its behavior is defined in terms of provided and required interfaces, is self-contained, and substitutable. A number of UML standard stereotypes exist that apply to components.

A component has an external and internal view, also known as "black-box" and "white-box", respectively. In its external view, there are public properties and operations. For its internal view, there are private properties and realizing classifiers and shows how external behavior is realized internally.

A component may be replaced at design time or run-time by another if and only if their provided and required interfaces are identical. This idea is the underpinning for the plug-and-play capability of component-based systems and promotes software reuse. Larger pieces of a system's functionality may be assembled by reusing components as parts in an encompassing component or assembly of components, and wiring together their required and provided interfaces.

A component acts like a package for all model elements that are involved in or related to its definition, which should be either owned or imported explicitly. Typically the classifiers related to a component are owned by it.

Components of a system are modeled by means of component diagrams throughout the development life cycle and successively refined into deployment and run-time.

In diagrams, components are shown as a rectangle with the keyword «component». Optionally, in the right hand corner a component icon can be displayed. This is a rectangle with two smaller rectangles protruding from its left hand side. If the icon symbol is shown, the keyword «component» may be hidden as seen to the side.

See also 

Package (UML)

References

External links
 Component in UML2
 Component Diagram in UML2

Unified Modeling Language